Ram Sewak Singh is an Indian politician and a member of Janata Dal (United) (JDU) political party. He served as a Member of Legislative Assembly (MLA) in Bihar Legislative Assembly for four terms. Singh, who gets elected from Hathua Assembly constituency became a minister for the first time in the Nitish government in 2019. Prior to this, he had held the post of Chief Whip of the ruling party JDU for two terms.  He is a resident of Asnand Tola village of Uchkagaon block. Before becoming an MLA, he was also the head of Balesra Panchayat. After winning the election of Mukhiya, He became MLA for the first time from Hathua assembly on the symbol of Nitish Kumar's JDU. This was followed by his consecutive election to Bihar Assembly for four times in a row.

Political career
Singh started his political career in the year 2001 by contesting for the post of Mukhiya (Head) of Balesara Panchayat of Hathua Assembly Constituency.  He won the Mukhiya election by 170 votes.
For the first time in February 2005, he won the election to Bihar Legislative Assembly by 7700 votes on  ticket of Janata Dal (United). After that, in the mid-term elections held in the month of October in the same year, he won the election again by 8 thousand votes. Despite all the contradictions, in the year 2010, he won the election by 22 thousand votes.
Then in 2015, he ensured victory in the election to state legislature for the fourth consecutive time by 23 thousand votes.

Earlier in 2005, the Hathua assembly constituency was known as Mirganj assembly constituency and after the delimitation exercise in 2010, Mirganj constituency itself ceased to exist. Singh won the first assembly election in 2005 from Mirganj and after its renaming as Hathua, he had the distinction to win for four times, from the same constituency, which includes a mid-term election in 2005. Due to his political achievements, he was made a minister and was allotted social welfare ministry.

However, in 2020 assembly elections, he was defeated by Rajesh Kumar Singh from the Hathua constituency.

Controversies
Singh was accused in a murder case involving assassination of a Bajrang Dal activist, Jai Bahadur Singh, who is said to be opposing his candidature a from the ruling party, Janata Dal (United). The grandson of the victim, Dhirendra Singh lodged an FIR in this case in Mirganj constituency area.

See also
Ram Balak Singh Kushwaha
Suraj Nandan Kushwaha
Satyendra Narayan Kushwaha

References

Janata Dal (United) politicians
Living people
Bihar MLAs 2010–2015
Bihar MLAs 2015–2020